Closed Circuit is the sixth and final album by New Zealand composer Peter Jefferies, released on October 23, 2001 through Emperor Jones.

Track listing

Personnel 
Michael Hill – engineering
Peter Jefferies – vocals, guitar, bass guitar, drums, percussion, piano, keyboards, production, engineering
Chris Smith – guitar
Lewis Boyes – guitar
Mark Cass Stevens – guitar, acoustic guitar, bass guitar
Jerry Tubb – mastering

References 

2001 albums
Peter Jefferies albums